Ronnie Magramo (born 1972), is a retired Filipino professional boxer. He was a contender in Minimumweight (105 lbs) in the 1990s.

Early life 
Magramo was born in 1972 in Mindoro Oriental, Philippines. His family members are mostly boxers such as Ric Magramo Sr., who was a contender in the 1960s and '70s, Ric Magramo Jr., Melvin Magramo and Giemel Magramo. The media called them "Skull and Bones Family".

Career 
He debuted in 1989, challenging for the Philippines Minimumweight title with Ala Villamor, but lost to a KO in the eighth round in 1992. He often traveled to Thailand. Each time, with a height of only , Magramo always makes it difficult for Thai boxers.

On August 22, 1993, he lost by unanimous decision to Chana Porpaoin in WBA Minimumweight title event in Saraburi province. On February 22, 1994, Magramo returned to Thailand to challenge IBF Mini flyweight with Ratanapol Sor Vorapin in Bang Mun Nak district, Phichit province, he was defeated again unanimously.

Two months later, Magramo again challenged in Thailand fighting Wanwin Charoen for the minor organization WBF Mini flyweight, the first WBF event in Thailand. This time, he won by KO in the second round. He defended the title twice, the first time he defeated Indonesian boxer Faisol Akbar in Manila. The second time he overcame with a split decision Thai boxer Nungdiaw Sakcharuporn on February 19, 1995, in Bangkok. Magramo returned to Thailand again to face Fahsang Pongsawang in Bangkok, but was defeated and lost his title.

Magramo recovered his title beating Pongsawang by KO in the 10th round at Ninoy Aquino Stadium, Malate, Manila. On September 29, 1996, he was defeated and lost the championship to Pongsawang, with unmatched scores at Selaphum district, Roi Et province, northeast Thailand.

Ronnie Magramo then earned seven wins and on January 30, 1999, he challenged for vacant WBA interim Minimumweight title against Songkram Porpaoin at Pattaya, Chonburi province, eastern Thailand. He was defeated with scores in the eighth round because Porpaoin had bleeding on head unable to continue fighting. Magramo retired after that.

See also
 List of boxing families

References

External links
 

1972 births
Living people
Mini-flyweight boxers
Sportspeople from Oriental Mindoro
Filipino male boxers